Albert Oliver Campos (born June 4, 1978) is a Spanish professional basketball player who last played for Obradoiro of the Liga ACB.

Professional career

On July 26, 2013, Oliver signed a two-year deal with Herbalife Gran Canaria of the Liga ACB. He re-signed with Gran Canaria on July 4, 2018. On October 12, 2018, at the age of 40, Oliver made his EuroLeague debut, and subsequently became the oldest player to score in the modern era of EuroLeague, since 2000.

On July 10, 2019,  Oliver signed with Real Betis for the 2019-20 season. He averaged 5.6 points per game.

On September 11, 2020, he signed a two-month deal with Obradoiro. The deal was extended to the end of the season on November 15. On July 10, 2021, Oliver signed a new one-year contract with the club.

Honours 
Caprabo Lleida

LEB: (1)
2001

Gran Canaria

 Supercopa de España: (1)
2016

References

External links

ACB.com Profile
EuroLeague.net Profile

1978 births
Living people
Bàsquet Manresa players
Basketball players from Catalonia
CB Estudiantes players
CB Gran Canaria players
Joventut Badalona players
Liga ACB players
Obradoiro CAB players
Point guards
Real Betis Baloncesto players
Spanish men's basketball players
Sportspeople from Terrassa
Valencia Basket players